Semu is the name of a caste established by the Yuan dynasty. The 31 Semu categories referred to people who came from Central and West Asia. They had come to serve the Yuan dynasty by enfranchising under the dominant Mongol caste. The Semu were not a self-defined and homogeneous ethnic group per se, but one of the four castes of the Yuan dynasty: the Mongols, Semu (or Semuren), the "Han" (Hanren in Chinese, or all subjects of the former Jin dynasty, Dali Kingdom and Koreans) and the Southerners (Nanren in Chinese, or all subjects of the former Southern Song dynasty; sometimes called Manzi). Among the Semu were Buddhist Turpan Uyghurs, Tanguts and Tibetans; Nestorian Christian tribes like the Ongud; Alans; Muslim Central Asian Turkic peoples including the Khwarazmians and Karakhanids; West Asian Arab, Jewish, Christians and other minor groups who are from even further west.

Name
Contrary to popular belief among both non-Chinese and Chinese, the term "Semu" (interpreted literally as "color-eye") did not imply that caste members had "colored eyes" and it was not a physical description of the people it labelled. It in fact meant "assorted categories" (各色名目, gè sè míng mù), emphasizing the ethnic diversity of Semu people.

Classification
The 31 Semu categories referred to people who came from Central and West Asia. They had come to serve the Yuan dynasty by enfranchising under the dominant Mongol caste. The Semu were not a self-defined and homogeneous ethnic group per se, but one of the four castes of the Yuan dynasty: the Mongols, Semu (or Semuren), the "Han" (Hanren in Chinese, or all subjects of the former Jin dynasty, Dali Kingdom and Koreans) and the Southerners (Nanren in Chinese, or all subjects of the former Southern Song dynasty; sometimes called Manzi). Among the Semu were Buddhist Turpan Uyghurs, Tanguts and Tibetans; Nestorian Christian tribes like the Ongud; Alans; Muslim Central Asian Persian and Turkic peoples including the Khwarazmians and Karakhanids; West Asian Jewish and other minor groups who are from even further Europe.

Islam was not the religion of the Uighurs during the Mongol Empire. The Uighur land itself was not Muslim inhabited while the Muslim lands were towards its west. They were Nestorian, Manichaeans, and Buddhist, and by Mongol times the Buddhists and Nestorians absorbed the Manichaeans, and Buddhist clerics dominated the Mongol employed educated sector of their own population. The '"Compendium of the Turkic Dialects" by Mahmud al-Kashgari, included among the infidels, the Uighurs. It was written "just as the thorn should be cut at its root, so the Uighur should be struck on the eye" by Kashgari, who viewed them as untrustworthy and noted that Muslim Turks used the derogatory name "Tat" against the Buddhist Uighurs whom Kashgari described as "infidels". The identities of "Buddhist" and "Uyghur" were intertwined with each other.

While administratively classified as Semu, many of these groups rather referred to themselves by their self-aware ethnic identities in everyday life, such as Uyghur. Muslims, Persians, Karakhanids and Khwarazmians in particular, were actually mistaken to be Uyghurs or at least, "from the land of the Uyghurs". Therefore, they adopted the label conferred to them by the Chinese: "Huihui", which was a corruption of the name Uyghur, but at the same time distinguishable from the name reserved for Buddhist Turpan Uyghurs proper, "Weiwuer". Of the many ethnic groups classified as "Semu" during the Yuan, only the Muslim Hui managed to survive into the Ming period as a large collective identity with self-awareness of common identity spanning across the whole China.

Other ethnic groups were either small and confined to limited localities (such as the Buddhist Turpan Uyghurs in Wuling, Hunan, and the Kaifeng Jews), or were forced to assimilate into the Han Chinese or Muslim Huis (such as some Christian and Jewish Semu in the Northwest, who, though thoroughly Islamicized, still unto this day retain peculiar labels like "Black Cap/Doppa Huihui", "Blue Cap Huihui").

The historian Frederick W. Mote wrote that the usage of the term "social classes" for this system was misleading and that the position of people within the four-class system was not an indication of their actual social power and wealth, but just entailed "degrees of privilege" to which they were entitled institutionally and legally so a person's standing within the classes was not a guarantee of their standing, since there were rich and well socially standing Chinese while there were less rich Mongol and Semu than there were Mongol and Semu who lived in poverty and were ill-treated.

The reason for the order of the classes and the reason why people were placed in a certain class was the date they surrendered to the Mongols, and had nothing to do with their ethnicity. The earlier they surrendered to the Mongols, the higher they were placed, the more the held out, the lower they were ranked. The Northern Chinese were ranked higher and Southern Chinese were ranked lower because southern China withstood and fought to the last before caving in. Major commerce during this era gave rise to favorable conditions for private southern Chinese manufacturers and merchants.

When the Mongols placed the Uighurs of the Kingdom of Qocho over the Koreans at the court the Korean King objected, then the Mongol Emperor Kublai Khan rebuked the Korean King, saying that the Uighur King of Qocho was ranked higher than the Karluk Kara-Khanid ruler, who in turn was ranked higher than the Korean King, who was ranked last, because the Uighurs surrendered to the Mongols first, the Karluks surrendered after the Uighurs, and the Koreans surrendered last, and that the Uighurs surrendered peacefully without violently resisting. Koreans were ranked as Han people along with northern Chinese.

Japanese historians like Uematsu, Sugiyama and Morita criticized the perception that a four class system existed under Mongol rule and Funada Yoshiyuki questioned the very existence of the Semu as a class.

The Yuan dynasty "Han people" classification included Koreans, Bohais, Jurchens and Khitans, and they are included in statistics of intermarriage between Semu and "Han people". Semu and Han intermarried with Mongols.The Haluhu (哈剌鲁) Semu married Koreans, Uighurs Tangwu, Mongols and Han during Yuan rule. Tibetan, Qincha, Uighur, Hui Hui, and Han intermarried with Korean women during the Yuan dynasty.

Korean women married Indian, Uyghur, and Turkic Semu men. This intermarriage of Korean women and Semu men was extensive in China during the Yuan dynasty.

A rich merchant from the Ma'bar Sultanate, Abu Ali (P'aehali) 孛哈里 (or 布哈爾 Buhaer), was associated closely with the Ma'bar royal family. After falling out with them, he moved to Yuan dynasty China and received a Korean woman as his wife and a job from the Mongol Emperor, the woman was formerly 桑哥 Sangha's wife and her father was 蔡仁揆 채송년 Ch'ae In'gyu during the reign of 忠烈 Chungnyeol of Goryeo, recorded in the Dongguk Tonggam, Goryeosa and 留夢炎 Liu Mengyan's 中俺集 Zhong'anji. 桑哥 Sangha was a Tibetan. Tamil Hindu Indian merchants traded in Quanzhou during the Yuan dynasty. Indian Hindu statues were found in Quanzhou dating to this period. Korean (Koryŏ) women's beauty was highly commended and viewed by the Ming Zhengde Emperor's Muslim advisor.

Gypsies were called 羅里回回 "Luoli Huihui". The term Lûrî which was of Persian origin was where Luoli derived from.

Zhuhu Huihui was a name for the Jews.

Lineages

Among the Huihui, or Hui, there were in fact Muslim lineages that have migrated to China via Central Asia or by sea route prior to the Yuan migration of merchants, adventurers, craftsmen and service men from the Muslim world to China. These Muslims were not previously known as Hui, but have come to associate themselves with the "Muslims from the land of the Khwarezem" by the mere fact of common religious identity. "Hui" has thus become synonymous with the Islamic religion in the Chinese language since the Ming period (but not before that). Besides identifying themselves as Huis, the Semu Muslims of the Yunnan province, especially those descended from the Khwarazmian statesman Sayyid Ajjal Shams al-Din Omar, or Sayyid Ajjal, came to be labeled as Panthay wherever they migrated to in Southeast Asia, including Myanmar and Thailand.

This name Panthay is particular to the Yunnan Huis and is not shared by Huis in other parts of China such as Fujian and Ningxia. Zheng He is probably the best-known Panthay Hui in the West. The learned Semu, including scribes, interpreters and statesmen who served the Mongol military class, were known for their contributions to Chinese literature and sciences. Many of them became masters of Chinese poetry and also helped compose state-commissioned historical works on previous dynasties. Their privileged position in the Yuan bureaucracy was in part due to the Mongol military class's distrust of the native Khitay and Manji subjects. One such Yuan Semu mandarin and poet was Guan Yunshi, a Turk of disputed origin.

Soldiers
After the fall of the Yuan, many Semu intellectuals and soldiers, due to their less entrenched loyalty to the Mongols, also became quickly assimilated into the Ming political culture and became prominent mandarins and aristocrats. Some no longer retained separate ethnic identity and became Han Chinese, others still served the Ming court as Muslim Huis. The Ming court's tolerance for loyal Muslims and respect for their practices and ethnic identity partially explains the strength and vitality of the Muslim Hui community in modern China, compared to other Semu groups such as the Christians and Jews.

Similar practices in other areas of the Mongol Empire

Bukhara and Samarqand were visited by Qiu Chuji. At the same time the Mongols imported Central Asian Muslims to serve as administrators in China, the Mongols also sent ethnic Han and Khitans from China to serve as administrators over the Muslim population in Bukhara and Samarqand in Central Asia, using foreigners to curtail the power of the local peoples of both lands. The surname of Li was held by one of Yelu Ahai's staff of Han descent. There were various Han craftsmen. Tangut, Khitan and Han peoples took control over gardens and fields from the Muslims. Han people were moved to Central Asian areas like Besh Baliq, Almaliq, and Samarqand by the Mongols where they worked as artisans and farmers. Alans were recruited into the Mongol forces with one unit called "Right Alan Guard" which was combined with "recently surrendered" soldiers, Mongols, and Han soldiers stationed in the area of the former Kingdom of Qocho and in Besh Balikh the Mongols established a military colony led by the ethnic Han general Qi Kongzhi (Ch'i Kung-chih).

After the Mongol conquest by Genghis Khan, foreigners were chosen as administrators and co-managers alongside Han and Khitans in the gardens and fields of Samarqand. Muslims were not allowed to manage without them.

The Mongol-appointed Governor of Samarqand, Ahai, was a Qara-Khitay (Khitan) who held the title Taishi. He was familiar with Han culture.

Muslims viewed Chagatai Khan with negativity and hostility because Chagatai Khan strictly enforced Mongol Yasa law against Islamic Shariah law banning Halal animal slaughter and Islamic prayer ritual ablution as well as the Islamic legal system. The Uyghur steward Vajir was accused of poisoning Chagatai Khan to death in 1242 by his wife Yisulun.

Ethnic Han officials and colonists were sent by the Yuan dynasty to areas of Lingbei Province (和宁路 益蘭州 謙州).

The 1258 Baghdad siege involved an ethnic Han officer. Each of Eurasia's ends saw their specialists moved to the other end under the Mongols. The Yenisei area had a community of weavers of Han origin and Samarkand and Outer Mongolia both had artisans of Han origin seen by Qiu Chuji.

Discrimination

Yuan dynasty
Genghis Khan and the following Yuan emperors forbade Islamic practices like Halal butchering, forcing Mongol methods of butchering animals on Muslims, and other restrictive degrees continued. Muslims had to slaughter sheep in secret. Genghis Khan directly called Muslims and Jews "slaves", and demanded that they follow the Mongol method of eating rather than the halal method. Circumcision was also forbidden. Jews were also affected, and forbidden by the Mongols to eat Kosher. Toward the end, corruption and the persecution became so severe that Muslim Generals joined Han Chinese in rebelling against the Mongols. The Ming founder Zhu Yuanzhang had Muslim Generals like Lan Yu who rebelled against the Mongols and defeated them in combat. Some Muslim communities had the name in Chinese which meant "barracks" and also mean "thanks"; many Hui Muslims claim it is because that they played an important role in overthrowing the Mongols and it was named in thanks by the Han Chinese for assisting them.

The Muslims in the semu class also revolted against the Yuan dynasty in the Ispah Rebellion but the rebellion was crushed and the Muslims were massacred by the Yuan loyalist commander Chen Youding. After the massacre, the remaining Jews and Muslims escaped. Some were back to their own country, but some like Jews escaped to Guangdong.

Anti-Muslim persecution by the Yuan dynasty and Ispah rebellion

The Yuan dynasty started passing anti-Muslim and anti-Semu laws and getting rid of Semu Muslim privileges towards the end of the Yuan dynasty, in 1340 forcing them to follow Confucian principles in marriage regulations, in 1329 all foreign holy men including Muslims had tax exemptions revoked, in 1328 the position of Muslim Qadi was abolished after its powers were limited in 1311. In the middle of the 14th century this caused Muslims to start rebelling against Mongol Yuan rule and joining rebel groups. In 1357-1367 the Yisibaxi Muslim Persian garrison started the Ispah rebellion against the Yuan dynasty in Quanzhou and southern Fujian. Persian merchants Amin ud-Din (Amiliding) and Saif ud-Din (Saifuding) led the revolt. Persian official Yawuna assassinated both Amin ud-Din and Saif ud-Din in 1362 and took control of the Muslim rebel forces. The Muslim rebels tried to strike north and took over some parts of Xinghua but were defeated at Fuzhou two times and failed to take it. Yuan provincial loyalist forces from Fuzhou defeated the Muslim rebels in 1367 after A Muslim rebel officer named Jin Ji defected from Yawuna.

The Muslim merchants in Quanzhou who engaged in maritime trade enriched their families which encompassed their political and trade activities as families. Historians see the violent Chinese backlash that happened at the end of the Yuan dynasty against the wealth of the Muslim and Semu as something inevitable, however anti-Muslim and anti-Semu laws had already been passed by the Yuan dynasty. In 1340 all marriages had to follow Confucian rules, in 1329 all foreign holy men and clerics including Muslims no longer were exempt from tax, in 1328 the Qadi (Muslim headmen) were abolished after being limited in 1311. This resulted in anti-Mongol sentiment among Muslims so some anti-Mongol rebels in the mid 14th century were joined by Muslims. Quanzhou came under control of Amid ud-Din (Amiliding) and Saif ud-Din (Saifuding), two Persian military officials in 1357 as they revolted against the Mongols from 1357-1367 in southern Fujian and Quanzhou, leading the Persian garrison (Ispah) They fought for Fuzhou and Xinghua for 5 years. Both Saifuding and Amiliding were murdered by another Muslim called Nawuna in 1362 so he then took control of Quanzhou and the Ispah garrison for 5 more years until his defeat by the Yuan.

Yuan Massacres of Muslims
The historian Chen Dasheng theorized that Sunni-Shia sectarian war contributed to the Ispah rebellion, claiming that the Pu family and their in-law Yawuna were Sunnis and there before the Yuan while Amiliding and Saifuding's Persian soldiers were Shia originally in central China and moved to Quanzhou and that Jin Ji was a Shia who defected to Chen Youding after Sunni Yawuna killed Amiliding and Saifuding. Three fates befell the Muslims and foreigners in Quanzhou, the ones in the Persian garrison were slaughtered, many Persians and Arab merchants fled abroad by ships, another small group that adopted Chinese culture were expelled into coastal Baiqi, Chendi, Lufu and Zhangpu and mountainous Yongchun and Dehua and one other part took refuge in Quanzhou's mosques. The genealogies of Muslim families which survived the transition are the main source of information for the rebellion times. The Rongshan Li family, one of the Muslim survivors of the violence in the Yuan-Ming transition period wrote about their ancestors Li Lu during the rebellion who was a businessman and shipped things, using his private stores to feed hungry people during the rebellion and using his connections to keep safe. The Ming takeover after the end of the Persian garrison meant that the diaspora of incoming Muslims ended. After the Persian garrison full and the rebellion was crushed, the common people started a slaughter of the Pu family and all Muslims: ''All of the Western peoples were annihilated, with a number of foreigners with large noses mistakenly killed while for three days the gates were closed and the executions were carried out. The corpses of the Pus were all stripped naked, their faces to the west. ... They were all judged according to the "five mutilating punishments" and then executed with their carcasses throwing into pig troughs. This was in revenge for their murder and rebellion in the Song.’’

80 merchant ships were commanded by Fo Lian, from Bahrain who was Pu Shougeng's son-in-law. The Qais born Supterintendent of Taxes for Persian and the Island, Jamal al-din Ibrahim Tibi had a son who was sent in 1297-1305 as an envoy to China. Wassaf, and Arab historian said that Jamal became wealthy due to trade with India and China. Patronage networks and monopolies controlled Yuan maritime trade unlike in the Song dynasty where foreigners and Chinese of the Song merchant elite reaped profits. Quanzhou's end as an international trading port was rapid as in 1357 rebellions broke out in central China so the Persian merchants Amin ud-din (Amiliding) and Saif ud-din (Saifuding) led soldiers to take over Quanzhou. A Pu family relative by marriage, Yawuna, another Muslim assassinated those two. The Muslim rebels of the Persian garrison in Quanzhou lasted a decade by exploiting maritime trade and plunder. Yawuna and his army were captured and defeated by provincial forces in 1366 and then the Ming took over Quanzhou 2 years later in 1368. Maritime trade was regulated and implemented extremely differently in the Ming dynasty. Guangzhou, Ningbo and Quanzhou all had maritime trade offices but they were limited to specific areas. The South Sea trade was no longer permitted in Quanzhou and only trade with Ryukyu was allowed in Quanzhou. The Muslim community in Quanzhou became a target of the people's anger. In the streets there was widescale slaughter of "big nosed" westerners and Muslims as recorded in a genealogical account of a Muslim family. The era of Quanzhou as an international trading port of Asia ended as did the role of Muslims as merchant diaspora in Quanzhou. Some Muslims fled by sea or land as they were persecuted by the locals and others tried to hide and lay low as depicted in the genealogies of Quanzhou Muslims despite the Ming emperors attempted to issue laws tolerating Islam in 1407 and 1368 and putting the notices in mosques. Qais was the island of Kish and its king Jamal al-Din Ibrahim bin Muhammad al-Tibi briefly seized control of Hormuz while he traded with China and India and earned great wealth from it.

One of Sayyid Ajall Shams al-Din Omar's descendants, the Jinjiang Ding fled to Chendai (Jinjiang]] on the coast of Quanzhou to avoid the violence of the Ispah rebellion. The Li family survived through philanthropy activities however they said that in the rebellion "great families scattered from their homes, which were burned by the soldiers, and few genealogies survived." and used the words "a bubbling cauldron" to describe Quanzhou. In 1368 Quanzhou came under Ming control and the atmosphere calmed down for the Muslims. The Ming Yongle emperor issued decrees of protection from individuals and officials in mosques such as Quanzhou mosques and his father before him Ming Taizu had support from Muslim generals in his wars to reunify the country so he showed tolerance to them. The Ming passed some laws saying that Muslims not use Chinese surnames. Some genealogies of Muslims like the Li family show debate over teaching Confucian culture and classics like Odes and History or to practice Islam. Ming Taizu passed laws concerning maritime trade which were the major impact upon the life of Quanzhou Muslims. He restricted official maritime trade in Quanzhou to Ryukyu and Guangzhou was to monopolize south sea trade in the 1370s and 1403-1474 after initial getting rid of the Office of Maritime Trade altogether in 1370. Up to the late 16th century, private trade was banned.

Persian Sunni Muslims Sayf al-din (Sai-fu-ding) and Awhad al-Din (A-mi-li-ding) started the Ispah rebellion in 1357 against the Yuan dynasty in Quanzhou and attempted to reach Fuzhou, capital of Fujian. Yuan general Chen Youding defeated the Muslim rebels and slaughtered Muslims of foreign descent in Quanzhou and areas next to Quanzhou. This led to many Muslim foreign fleeing to Java and other places in Southeast Asia to escape the massacres, spreading the Islamic religion. Gresik was ruled by a person from China's Guangdong province and it had a thousand Chinese families who moved there in the 14th century with the name Xin Cun (New Village) in Chinese. THis information was reported by Ma Huan who accompanied Zheng He to visit Java in the 15th century. Ma Huan also mentions Guangdong was the source of many Muslims from China who moved to Java.  Cu Cu/Jinbun was said to be Chinese. And like most Muslims form China, Wali Sanga Sunan Giri was Hanafi according to Stamford Raffles. Ibn Battuta had visited Quanzhou's large multi-ethnic Muslim community before the Ispah rebellion in 1357 when Muslim soldiers attempted to rebel against the Yuan dynasty.  In 1366 the Mongols slaughtered the Sunni Muslims of Quanzhou and ended the rebellion. The Yuan dynasty's violent end saw repeated slaughters of Muslims until the Ming dynasty in 1368. The role of trade in Quanzhou ended as Sunni Muslims fled to Southeast Asia from Quanzhou. The surviving Muslims who fled Quanzhou moved to Manila bay, Brunei, Sumatra, Java and Champa to trade. Zheng He's historian Ma Huan noticed the presence of these Muslim traders in Southeast Asia who had fled form China in his voyages in Barus in Sumatra, Trengganu on the Malayan peninsula, Brunei and Java. The Nine Wali Sanga who converted Java to Islam had Chinese names and originated from Chinese speaking Quanzhou Muslims who fled there in the 14th century around 1368. The Suharto regime banned talk about this after Mangaradja Parlindungan, a Sumatran Muslim engineer wrote about it in 1964.

Ming dynasty
After expelling the Mongols, the Ming dynasty was soon founded. Because of the Semu's help, some of them were being employed into the central government. However, the Ming dynasty enforced assimilation to Chinese customs, such as banning used their own languages, customs, names and instead switching to speaking Chinese and using Chinese names and intermarrying with Han people.

Both Mongol and Central Asian Semu Muslim women and men were required by Ming Code to marry Han Chinese after the first Ming Emperor Hongwu passed the law in Article 122.

The aim for it is to reduce Semu's population since Semu was in the second class in Yuan and used to help the Mongols.Some Hui claim that the order was secretly done by the Ming Hongwu Emperor to protect them from attacks since they stood out while they thought Zhu was a Hui too.

Indeed, Zhu was not a Hui while at that time only the Semu used this name. But in the middle period of Ming Dynasty, the royalties separated Semu into different groups while the groups as Muslims and Tibetans were still many. The Islam and Tibetan religions have survived until today. But the minority groups such as Jews, most of their customs were no more, leaving them into the Han group. This separation continued until the establishment of the Republic of China. Although the Communist Party of China founded the People's Republic, Chinese are scientifically separated into more groups which is now determined to be as many as 56 different ethnic groups. Some people claim that this number is higher than the periods before.

The new separation doesn't mean there are only 56 ethnic groups. This list doesn't include small populations like Jewish. Even if such ethnicities are so few in numbers, they still continue to exist in China.

The Ming dynasty allowed Islam and Judaism to be practiced and issued edicts that said they conformed to Confucianism while it banned religions such as Nestorian Christianity, Manicheanism and the White Lotus sect. Nestorian Christianity and Manicheanism died out during the Ming dynasty while Islam and Judaism were protected.

Around 1376 the 30-year-old Chinese merchant Lin Nu visited Ormuz in Persia, converted to Islam, and married a Semu girl (“娶色目女”) (either a Persian or an Arab girl) and brought her back to Quanzhou in Fujian. The Confucian philosopher Li Zhi was their descendant. This was recorded in the Lin and Li genealogy (林李宗谱).

An anti pig slaughter edict led to speculation that the Zhengde Emperor adopted Islam due to his use of Muslim eunuchs who commissioned the production of porcelain with Persian and Arabic inscriptions in white and blue color. The guard was Yu Yung and the women were Uighur. It is unknown who really was behind the anti-pig slaughter edict. The speculation of him becoming a Muslim is remembered alongside his excessive and debauched behavior along with his concubines of foreign origin. Muslim Central Asian girls were favored by Zhengde like how Korean girls were favored by Xuande. A Uighur concubine was kept by Zhengde. Foreign origin Uighur and Mongol women were favored by the Zhengde emperor.

Tatar (Mongol) and Central Asian women were bedded by Zhengde and he wore Mongol clothing and was fluent in Mongol language, and he adopted Persian, Buddhist, and Mongol names and titles 威武大將軍太師鎮國公  沙吉敖爛  大寶法王 忽必列. probably studied Persian and Tibetan as well.

Zhengde received Central Asian Muslim Semu women from his Muslim guard Yu Yong

The Uyghurs of Taoyuan are the remnants of Uyghurs from Turpan from the Kingdom of Qocho.

See also
 Yuan dynasty in Inner Asia
 Marco Polo

References

Ethnic groups in China
Yuan dynasty
Chinese words and phrases